Jukal is a village in Ranga Reddy district in Telangana, India. It falls under Shamshabad mandal. The population of the village is 700.

References

Villages in Ranga Reddy district